Catoosa High School is a high school in the Catoosa Public Schools system, for students in ninth through twelfth grades.

Campus
The campus consists of one main building, including a cafeteria. Also on the campus are the school's athletic facilities − an activity center for basketball, wrestling, and volleyball; Frank McNabb Field (football and soccer); a baseball field; and a softball field.

Extracurricular activities

Music and arts
 Arts
 Choir
 Band
 Debate

Athletics
Catoosa Public School fields 16 athletics teams. The Indians have won 7 state championships in their history as recognized by the Oklahoma Secondary Schools Athletic Association.

The following is a list of the sports in which the school competes and the years, if any, during which the school's team won the state championship:

 Baseball
 Boys Basketball
 Girls Basketball
 Cheerleading
 Boys Cross Country
 Girls Cross Country
 Football
 Boys Golf
 Girls Golf
 Boys Soccer
 State champion – 2004
 Girls Soccer
 State champion – 1996
 Softball
 Boys Track
 Girls Track
 Volleyball
 Wrestling
 State team champion – 1982, 2007, 2008
 State duel champion – 2006, 2008

References

1980 establishments in Oklahoma
Educational institutions established in 1980
Public high schools in Oklahoma
Schools in Rogers County, Oklahoma